The 1998 Speedway Grand Prix of Poland was the fifth race of the 1999 Speedway Grand Prix season. It took place on 28 September in the Polonia Stadium in Bydgoszcz, Poland

Starting positions draw 

The Speedway Grand Prix Commission nominated British rider Jacek Gollob and a Piotr Protasiewicz as Wild Card.
Draw 22.  (12) Marian Jirout →  (25) Mark Loram

Heat details

The intermediate classification

See also 
 Speedway Grand Prix
 List of Speedway Grand Prix riders

References

External links 
 FIM-live.com
 SpeedwayWorld.tv

P2
1999
1999
Speedway Grand Prix Of Poland Ii, 1999